Disha Biswas (born 3 April 2004) is a Bangladeshi cricketer who plays for the Bangladesh women's national under-19 cricket team as a right-handed batter and a right-arm medium bowler.

Career
In December 2022, Shorna was selected in the Bangladesh's under-19 squad as captain for the 2023 ICC Under-19 Women's T20 World Cup.

In January 2023, she was named in Bangladesh's squad for the 2023 ICC Women's T20 World Cup.

References

External links
 

2004 births
Living people
People from Magura District
Bangladeshi women cricketers